Tiruppur Corporation is a civic body that governs Tiruppur, Tamil Nadu, India. The corporation consists of 60 wards each represented by a councilor. The Mayor elected by the council is the leader of the civic body.

History
Tiruppur was formed as a small union and on 1 December 1947, it became a town with the inclusion of  Mannarai, Thennamapalayam, Karuvampalayam, and Valipalayam villages. On 26 October 2008 it became a Municipal Corporation.

Mannarai is a 34th ward TCMC

Elected mayors
N. Dinesh Kumar 2022 Onwards

References

Tiruppur
Municipal corporations in Tamil Nadu
2008 establishments in Tamil Nadu